Elizabeth D. Sherwood-Randall (born October 4, 1959) is an American national security and energy leader, public servant, educator, and author currently serving as the 11th United States Homeland Security Advisor to President Joe Biden since 2021.  She previously served in the Clinton and Obama Administrations and held appointments at academic institutions and think tanks.

She was born in Los Angeles, California, and attended Harvard University. After completing her bachelor’s degree at Harvard, she received a Rhodes Scholarship and a doctorate in international relations at Oxford University. She and her brother, Ben Sherwood, were the first brother and sister from the same family to win Rhodes Scholarships. 

After receiving her doctorate, Sherwood-Randall served in 1986-1987 as the chief foreign affairs and defense policy advisor to then-Senator Joseph R. Biden. From 1990 to 1993, she was the Associate Director of the Harvard Kennedy School Belfer Center’s Strengthening Democratic Institutions Project, which she co-founded with former Kennedy School Dean and Professor Graham Allison. 

During the Clinton administration, Sherwood-Randall served from 1994-1996 as the Deputy Assistant Secretary of Defense for Russia, Ukraine, and Eurasia. After departing public service, she became a founding principal of the Harvard-Stanford Preventive Defense Project from 1997-2008, serving with other former senior Defense Department officials including William J. Perry, Ash Carter, and GEN (ret.) John Shalikashvili. 

After providing advice to the Hillary Clinton and Barack Obama 2008 presidential campaigns, she joined the National Security Council at the White House in January 2009. She served as Special Assistant to the President and Senior Director for European Affairs during President Obama’s first term. In 2013 she was promoted to White House Coordinator for Defense Policy, Countering Weapons of Mass Destruction, and Arms Control. In July 2014 she was nominated by President Obama to become the 18th United States Deputy Secretary of Energy and, following Senate confirmation in September 2014, she served in that role from October 2014 until January 20, 2017.
Following her departure from government service in 2017, she held an array of professorial and senior fellow positions at academic institutions, including at the Harvard Kennedy School Belfer Center for Science and International Affairs and at the Georgia Institute of Technology.   

After advising the Biden 2020 presidential campaign and transition team, Sherwood-Randall was discussed as a lead contender to be President Biden’s Secretary of Energy. Instead, she was appointed as the President’s White House Homeland Security Advisor and Deputy National Security Advisor in January 2021.

Early life and education
Sherwood-Randall’s great grandparents emigrated to the United States from Eastern Europe in the late 19th century. Her paternal grandparents met at the public library in Anaconda, Montana, and married and moved westward, eventually settling in Los Angeles, California, where her father, Richard E. Sherwood, was born in 1929.  Her mother’s parents began their family life in Omaha, Nebraska, where her mother Dorothy Lipsey Romonek was born in 1932. The family moved to Los Angeles in the early 1940s. Her parents met in high school, were married in 1953, and remained married until her father’s early death in 1993. Her father was a Los Angeles civic leader and a partner in the law firm of O’Melveny and Myers, where as a corporate litigator he specialized in antitrust law. Dorothy and Richard Sherwood were active in supporting the growth of the Los Angeles cultural community, including the Los Angeles County Museum of Art, the Center Theater Group, and the California Institute of the Arts.

Early career 
From January 1986 to September 1987, she served as principal advisor on all foreign and defense policy matters to then-Senator Joe Biden, at the time ranking member of the Senate Foreign Relations Committee and chairman of the Subcommittee on European Affairs. From 1990-1993, she was the Associate Director of the Harvard Kennedy School Belfer Center’s Strengthening Democratic Institutions Project, which she co-founded with former Kennedy School Dean and Professor Graham Allison.  In the Clinton Administration, from 1994 to 1996, Sherwood-Randall served as Deputy Assistant Secretary of Defense for Russia, Ukraine, and Eurasia.  During this period, she led the effort to denuclearize three former Soviet states, for which she was awarded the Department of Defense Medal for Distinguished Public Service and the Nunn-Lugar Trailblazer Award. From 1997 to 2008, she was a Founding Principal of the Harvard-Stanford Preventive Defense Project. She was also a Senior Research Scholar at Stanford University's Center for International Security and Cooperation from 2000 to 2008. In 2004, she was selected to become a Carnegie Scholar and used the prize to support research as an Adjunct Senior Fellow at the Council on Foreign Relations, where she developed recommendations to strengthen the Transatlantic alliance to meet the challenges of the new century.

Obama Administration

National Security Council 
During the first term of Barack Obama, Sherwood-Randall served as Special Assistant to the President and Senior Director for European Affairs on the White House National Security Council.  She focused on revitalizing America's unique network of alliance relationships and strengthening cooperation with 49 countries and three international institutions in Europe (NATO, the EU, and the OSCE) to advance U.S. global interests. At the start of Obama's second term, she was appointed the White House Coordinator for Defense Policy, Countering Weapons of Mass Destruction, and Arms Control. In this new role her responsibilities included defense policy and budgeting; the DOD-DOE nuclear weapons enterprise; military sexual assault prevention; implementation of the Prague arms control and nuclear security agenda; and the elimination of Syria's declared chemical weapons. She served as the Presidential Sherpa for the Nuclear Security Summit in 2014, which mobilized international actions to prevent terrorist acquisition of fissile materials.

Department of Energy
Sherwood-Randall was nominated by President Obama to be Deputy Secretary of Energy and confirmed by the United States Senate on September 18, 2014. At the Department of Energy she launched a major initiative in partnership with leaders of the American electricity, oil and gas sectors to tackle emerging cyber and physical challenges to the power grid. She stated in 2016 that "we need to accelerate the transition to a low-carbon economy and spur innovation and science and technology...so that we can power the world with low-carbon power." Sherwood-Randall noted in a Council on Foreign Relations speech in 2016 that an "all of the above" energy strategy included "decreasing the amount of water we use, deploying new nuclear technologies, better transmission infrastructure, advanced manufacturing, and, importantly, carbon capture and storage for fossil fuels.”

Developing Human Capital in Public Service 
During her tenure as Deputy Secretary of Energy, Sherwood-Randall emphasized recruiting and strengthening a more diverse workforce at the Department of Energy. She worked with minority-serving colleges and institutions to convey opportunities for their students within the Department and offered professional and career-based training for those students. She frequently encouraged and mentored young people to consider pathways to public service. In concert with her work on diversity, equity, and inclusion in the Federal workforce, Sherwood-Randall became a staunch advocate for appropriate protections for the Federal workforce, including for whistleblowers. In 2017, she decried the growing tendency to vilify civil servants and target them based on ideology and in 2020 she advocated for strengthened protections for whistleblowers.

Biden administration

Preventing, Preparing for and Responding to Homeland Disasters 
As the Homeland Security Advisor, Sherwood-Randall coordinated Federal support to State and local leaders, NGOs, and the private sector to prevent, prepare for and respond effectively to disasters, whether natural or manmade.

Building Resilient Infrastructure 
Early in the Biden Administration, Sherwood-Randall noted that these events would require an effort to strengthen and harden critical infrastructure to create better resiliency for the future. Sherwood-Randall spearheaded initiatives to harden critical Infrastructure and build resilience to the full spectrum (natural, physical, and/or cyber) of threats. In response to the Colonial Pipeline ransomware attack, Sherwood-Randall discussed the Federal interagency response and coordination with both states and private sector entities impacted by the pipeline shutdown. In September 2022, she opened the first meeting of the President’s National Infrastructure Advisory Council.

CounterTerrorism Policy Reform 
In the Biden Administration, Sherwood-Randall led the reform of counterterrorism policies to align with evolving threats, including by spearheading the development of the first national domestic terrorism strategy. In 2021 remarks at the University of Virginia, Sherwood-Randall described the four pillars of the strategy to counter domestic terrorism as understanding and sharing information, prevention of domestic terror, disrupting and deterring domestic terrorists, and addressing long-term contributors to domestic terrorism. Later in the same year, Sherwood-Randall stated in remarks to the Atlantic Council that the Biden administration was seeking to keep pace with evolving global terrorist threats, setting priorities and matching resources to challenges, and adapting approaches using the full range of tools available to the nation. As part of this effort, Sherwood-Randall led interagency delegations to Africa, Europe and the Middle East to advance the Administration’s counterterrorism policies through close coordination with allies and partners. The new international counterterrorism strategy was promulgated in October 2022. After the President reportedly made a decision limiting counterterrorism drone strikes outside conventional war zones, Sherwood-Randall issued a statement that the changes allowed the U.S. government to be “discerning and agile in protecting Americans against evolving global terrorist challenges.”

Mass Migration and Human Trafficking 
Sherwood-Randall advocated for building an integrated regional system to manage unprecedented human migration in the Western Hemisphere, with the objective of reducing dangerous irregular migration and incentivizing legal migration. She contributed to the National Action Plan to Combat Human Trafficking, countering efforts by human smugglers and human traffickers who take advantage of vulnerable populations. When the plan was released, Sherwood-Randall was quoted stating “Human trafficking is an evil practice that contradicts who we are as Americans and the rights we cherish. With this National Action Plan, we reaffirm our commitment to preventing and punishing human trafficking in all its forms and to addressing the social and economic conditions that can create greater vulnerabilities for marginalized groups.”

Afghan Evacuee Relocation 
When it became apparent that the Government of Afghanistan would fall in 2021, Sherwood-Randall was among the senior White House officials deliberating about how to manage a noncombatant evacuation operation from Kabul. According to a leaked Summary of Conclusions document, she chaired a National Security Council Deputies Small Group that set priorities for evacuation of U.S. staff and citizens and Afghan partners and metrics for measuring success. Ultimately, more than 80,000 Afghans were screened and vetted, relocated to the United States, and resettled in American communities.

Counter-UAS strategies and policies 
Sherwood-Randall led efforts to stem the proliferation of new technologies that could negatively impact homeland security, including through the development of an ambitious counter-unmanned aircraft systems (UAS) strategy. This initiative took on new urgency with the increasing frequency of drone incursions into controlled airspace, threatening commercial air traffic security. In 2022, the Biden Administration published the Domestic Counter-Unmanned Aircraft Systems National Action Plan, which laid out eight necessary actions to be taken across the Federal government. Sherwood-Randall called upon Congress to pass legislation in support of the National Action Plan in a June 2022 DefenseOne op-ed.

Scholarly Publications
She has written on a variety of national security issues, including on U.S alliances and preventing nuclear proliferation. Her first book, Allies in Crisis: Meeting Global Challenges to Western Security, examined the origins and history of the North Atlantic Treaty Organization and described how it handled crises outside of Europe without weakening allied capabilities or distracting from its main purpose. In 2006, she wrote the monograph Alliances and American National Security, which makes the case for modernizing U.S. alliances as a means to reach the nation's national security goals. In 2020, she authored "The Age of Strategic Instability: How Novel Technologies Disrupt the Nuclear Balance", which was published in Foreign Affairs.

Personal life
She is married to neurosurgeon Jeffrey Randall. They have two sons.

References

External links

Elizabeth Sherwood-Randall Deputy Secretary of Energy on Energy.gov
Senate hearing for Elizabeth Sherwood-Randall's nomination for Deputy Secretary of Energy on energy.senate.gov.

1959 births
Living people
People from Los Angeles
Harvard University alumni
American Rhodes Scholars
Alumni of Balliol College, Oxford
Clinton administration personnel
Stanford University people
21st-century non-fiction writers
Obama administration personnel
United States Deputy Secretaries of Energy
Georgia Tech faculty
Biden administration personnel